Ben Bolt is an unincorporated community and census-designated place (CDP) in south central Jim Wells County, Texas, United States,  south of Alice on U.S. Route 281. It was first listed as a CDP in the 2020 census with a population of 1,662.

History
Ben Bolt was founded in 1904. The community took its name from the popular song "Ben Bolt and Sweet Alice".

Geography
Ben Bolt is located at  (27.6475, -98.08333).

Education
Most of Ben Bolt is served by the Ben Bolt-Palito Blanco ISD. A small portion is within the Alice Independent School District. The schools of the former district include Palito Blanco Elementary School for grades K-3, Ben Bolt Middle School for grades 4-8, and Ben Bolt-Palito Blanco High School for grades 9-12. Alice High School is of the latter district.

References

Unincorporated communities in Jim Wells County, Texas
Unincorporated communities in Texas
1904 establishments in Texas
Census-designated places in Jim Wells County, Texas
Census-designated places in Texas